Kemal Hafizović (born 12 May 1950) is a Bosnian professional football manager and former player, best known for his playing and managerial career with hometown club Čelik Zenica.

Apart from his 1996–97 title winning season with Čelik, Hafizović is also remembered as leading Čelik to UEFA Intertoto Cup wins against Turkish club Denizlispor and Belgian club Gent in 2001.

Honours

Manager
Čelik Zenica
First League of Bosnia and Herzegovina: 1996–97

References

External links
Kemal Hafizović at Soccerpunter

1950 births
Living people
Sportspeople from Zenica
Association football wingers
Bosnia and Herzegovina footballers
Yugoslav footballers
FK Rudar Kakanj players
NK Čelik Zenica players
Toronto Blizzard (1971–1984) players
NK Maribor players
Yugoslav First League players
Yugoslav Second League players
North American Soccer League (1968–1984) players
Yugoslav expatriate footballers
Expatriate soccer players in Canada
Yugoslav expatriate sportspeople in Canada
Yugoslav football managers
Bosnia and Herzegovina football managers
FK Rudar Kakanj managers
NK Čelik Zenica managers 
FK Velež Mostar managers
NK Travnik managers 
NK Krajišnik Velika Kladuša managers
Premier League of Bosnia and Herzegovina managers
Bosniaks of Bosnia and Herzegovina